Jacqueline Manicom (1935 – 1976) was a Guadeloupean writer, professor, broadcaster, feminist, and midwife, author of the novels Mon examen de blanc (1972) and La graine : journal d'une sage-femme (1974).

Early life 
Manicom was born in Guadeloupe, the eldest of twenty children born to parents of South Asian origin. She trained as a midwife, and studied law and philosophy in Paris.

Career 
Manicom worked at a public hospital in Paris as a young woman. She also worked in radio and television, and taught philosophy courses. In the late 1960s she worked with Simone de Beauvoir on women's rights in France, was a founding member of Choisir la Cause des Femmes (CHOISIR), and especially focused her activism on the legalization of abortion. She and her husband founded a family planning clinic in Guadeloupe. 

Manicom wrote two autobiographical novels in French, Mon examen de blanc (1972) and La graine : journal d'une sage-femme (1974), both stories of Caribbean immigrant women in medical settings, both with themes of race, class, gender, and sexuality in the context of French colonialism and French Caribbean independence.

Personal life 
Manicom married philosophy professor Yves Letourneur. They had two children. She died in 1976, aged 41 years.

References

External links 

 Sybil Shevron Jackson, "Dark Phoenix: The Representation of Black Woman in Je Suis Martiniquaise by Mayotte Capecia and Mon Examen De Blanc by Jacqueline Manicom" (PhD dissertation, Louisiana State University, 1999).
 Vivienne Liley, "Division and fragmentation in the work of three Gualdeloupean novelists: Mic'hele Lacrosil, Jacqueline Manicom and Simone Schwarz-Bart" (PhD thesis, Queen Mary, University of London, 1993).

1935 births
1976 deaths
Guadeloupean writers
Guadeloupean women writers
Midwives
Feminists
Abortion-rights activists